KSES-FM is a regional Mexican-formatted radio station licensed to Seaside, California, broadcasting to the Santa Cruz area on 107.1 MHz FM. The station is currently owned by Entravision Communications.

KSES-FM is part of Entravision's Suavecita radio network.

On January 8, 2018, KSES-FM changed their format from Spanish adult hits (as "Jose") to regional Mexican, branded as "Radio La Suavecita".

References

External links

SES-FM
Radio stations established in 1972
SES-FM
Entravision Communications stations
1972 establishments in California
Regional Mexican radio stations in the United States
Mainstream adult contemporary radio stations in the United States